Santa Maria is a populated place situated in Maricopa County, Arizona, United States. Originally a rural settlement, Santa Maria is now surrounded by Estrella, Phoenix.

Santa Maria is one of two populated places with this name in Maricopa County, the other being a neighborhood in the City of Glendale.

References

Populated places in Maricopa County, Arizona